Gao Yang (1909–2009) was a People's Republic of China politician. He was born in Liaoyang County, Liaoning Province. He was Communist Party of China Committee Secretary of Hebei Province (1982–1986) and President of the Central Party School of the Communist Party of China (1987–1989). He was a member of the State Council of the People's Republic of China (1965–1970).

1909 births
2009 deaths
People's Republic of China politicians from Liaoning
Chinese Communist Party politicians from Liaoning
Political office-holders in Hebei
Delegates to the 1st National People's Congress
Delegates to the 2nd National People's Congress
Delegates to the 3rd National People's Congress
Members of the Central Advisory Commission
Politicians from Liaoyang